Sandy Brown may refer to:

Sandy Brown (cricketer) (born 1950), Scottish cricketer
Sandy Brown (footballer, born 1877) (1877–1944), Scottish footballer
Sandy Brown (footballer, born 1939) (1939–2014), Scottish footballer (Partick Thistle, Everton)
Sandy Brown (musician) (1929–1975), Scottish clarinettist
Sandy brown (color), a colour and shade of brown
Sandy Brown (ceramist) (born 1946), British ceramist

See also
Alexander Brown (disambiguation)
Sandra Brown (disambiguation)